The SC 500 was a German Sprengbombe Cylindrisch ("cylindrical explosive bomb") was a family of 500 kg weight general-purpose bombs used by the Luftwaffe during World War II.

Design 

They had three-piece drawn steel bodies with a heavy machined nose cap for armor penetration.  At the other end was a base plate, just forward of which the magnesium alloy tail was tack welded onto the body, and also bolted to the tail attachment brace.  The bomb was usually filled with a mixture of 40% amatol and 60% Trotyl, but when used as an anti-shipping bomb it was filled with Trialen 105, a mixture of 15% hexogen, 70% Trotyl and 15% aluminium powder.  Around the nose of the bomb was a kopfring - a metal ring, triangular in cross section, designed to prevent ground penetration or to stop forward momentum when hitting water.  The bomb could also be fitted with a Stabo Spike which was an anti-ricochet device that prevented the bomb from burying itself too deep to increase its anti-personnel effectiveness.  The bomb was attached to the aircraft horizontally by a H-type suspension lug.  It could be horizontally suspended in a bomb bay or horizontally mounted on a wing or fuselage hardpoint.

References

World War II aerial bombs of Germany